Nesbit may refer to:

People
 E. Nesbit (Edith Nesbit) (1858–1924), English author and poet 
 Evelyn Nesbit (1884–1967), American artists' model and chorus girl, and a central figure in a notorious murder trial
 Jamar Nesbit (born 1976), American football player
 Pinna Nesbit (1896–1950), Canadian silent film actress
 William Nesbit (thief) (1899–1983), American jewel thief
 Nesbit Willoughby (1777–1849), British naval officer
 "Mrs. Nesbit", the name given to Buzz Lightyear when he attends a tea party in the first Toy Story.

Places
 Nesbit Township, Minnesota, a township in Polk County, in northwest Minnesota, United States
 Nesbit, Mississippi, a town located in DeSoto County in northwest Mississippi, United States 
 Nesbit, Missouri, an unincorporated community
 Nesbit, Northumberland, a hamlet and former civil parish near Wooler, in Northumberland, England
 Nesbitt, Northumberland, a former civil parish, now in Stamfordham parish, near Prudhoe, England
 Battle of Nesbit Moor (1355), battle between Scottish raiders and English forces near the border
 Battle of Nesbit Moor (1402), battle between Scottish raiders and English forces near the border

Things
 Nesbit partial, a unilateral removable partial denture

See also
 Nisbet (disambiguation)
 Nesbitt (disambiguation)